Echtenerbrug is a small village in De Fryske Marren in the province of Friesland, the Netherlands. It has a population of around 1035 including surrounding area.

The villages of Delfstrahuizen and Echtenerbrug are separated by a canal.

History 
The village was first mentioned in 1718 as Echterbrug, and means bridge near Echten. Echtenerbrug is a road village which developed in the Middle Ages to the east of Echten.

Gallery

References

External links

De Fryske Marren
Populated places in Friesland